The Office for Students (OfS) is a non-departmental public body of the Department for Education, acting as the regulator and competition authority for the higher education sector in England.

In February 2021, James Wharton, Baron Wharton of Yarm was made the new chair.

History 
The regulator was established by the Higher Education and Research Act 2017, coming into existence on 1 January 2018. It merged the Higher Education Funding Council for England and the Office for Fair Access, and formally inherited their responsibilities, while 'working in the interests of students and prospective students' and having 'a wider remit ... taking charge of the granting of degree awarding powers and university title.' The OfS inherited HEFCE's funding responsibilities (aside from those for research which passed to United Kingdom Research and Innovation), and OFFA's responsibility for promoting fair access to higher education.

Responsibilities
The OfS website lists its main areas of work as:
 Helping students to get into and succeed in higher education.
 Helping students stay informed.
 Making sure that students get a high-quality education that prepares them for the future.
 Protecting students’ interests.
It notes that it is not responsible for tuition fees, students loans or other aspects of individual student funding, and that it cannot usually get involved in individual complaints about universities and colleges.

The OfS's other functions include the administration of the Teaching Excellence Framework and the Register of higher education providers. It is responsible both for administering the prevent duty and for ensuring that universities allow freedom of speech for controversial guest speakers.

Accountable officer
Registered higher education providers must nominate an accountable officer to the OfS. This is normally the chief executive of the provider, but may be the senior officer responsible for higher education in a provider that  also carries out other activities not related to higher education. The accountable officer reports on the provider's behalf to the OfS, the designated data body and the designated quality body. They are personally responsible for funding received from the OfS and Research England and for the loans received from the Student Loans Company on behalf of the provider's students for payment of tuition fees. They can be required to appear before the Public Accounts Committee alongside the head of the OfS to answer questions about the registration and funding of the provider.

Leadership
The current OfS Chair is Lord Wharton and its Chief Executive is Susan Lapworth. They both serve on the OfS board, along with:

 Martin Coleman (deputy chair), formerly Norton Rose Fulbright
 Gurpreet Dehal, formerly Credit Suisse
 Elizabeth Fagan, managing director of Boots
 Katja Hall, formerly of HSBC
 Verity Hancock, Principal and Chief Executive of Leicester College
 Kathryn King, former Chief Legal Ombudsman for England and Wales
 Kate Lander, Eukleia Training
 Simon Levine, CEO of DLA Piper
 Martha Longdon, student representative
 John Blake, Director for Fair Access and Participation
 David Palfreyman, Director of the Oxford Centre for Higher Education Policy Studies
 Steve West, vice-chancellor of UWE

The board is advised by a panel of students.

Controversy 
The appointment of Toby Young to the board, announced on 1 January 2018, generated controversy over his suitability for the post. As at 8 January 2018, over 200,000 people had signed an online petition protesting his appointment. In response to questioning the Prime Minister declared herself comfortable with his appointment, while the Universities minister defended him in the House of Commons. After criticism from leading Tory MPs, Young resigned on that day, claiming he had been turned into a caricature.

See also
 Research Councils UK
 Higher Education Funding Council for Wales
 Higher Education Statistics Agency (based in Cheltenham)
 UCAS
 Jisc
 Research Excellence Framework
 Teaching Excellence Framework

References

External links

Funding bodies of England
Government agencies established in 2018
Higher education authorities
Higher education in England
Higher education organisations based in the United Kingdom
Non-departmental public bodies of the United Kingdom government
Organisations based in Bristol
Regulators of England
Statutory corporations of the United Kingdom government
2018 establishments in England
Students in the United Kingdom